Hippeastrum canterai is a flowering  perennial herbaceous bulbous plant, in the family Amaryllidaceae, native to Uruguay.

Taxonomy 
Described by José Arechavaleta in 1899.

References

Sources 
 
 GBIF: Hippeastrum canterai

Flora of South America
canterai
Garden plants of South America